The 2019 Porsche Tennis Grand Prix was a women's tennis tournament played on indoor clay courts. It was the 42nd edition of the Porsche Tennis Grand Prix, and part of the Premier tournaments of the 2019 WTA Tour. It took place at the Porsche Arena in Stuttgart, Germany, from 22 April until 28 April 2019.

Points and prize money

Point distribution

Prize money

* per team

Singles main draw entrants

Seeds

 1 Rankings are as of 15 April 2019.

Other entrants
The following players received wildcards into the main draw:
  Dominika Cibulková
  Andrea Petkovic
  Laura Siegemund

The following players received entry from the qualifying draw:
  Anna-Lena Friedsam
  Mandy Minella
  Greet Minnen
  Sara Sorribes Tormo

The following players received entry as lucky losers:
 Giulia Gatto-Monticone
 Vera Zvonareva

Withdrawals 
Before the tournament
  Danielle Collins → replaced by  Hsieh Su-wei
  Simona Halep → replaced by  Giulia Gatto-Monticone
  Garbiñe Muguruza → replaced by  Vera Zvonareva
  Sloane Stephens → replaced by  Anastasia Pavlyuchenkova
  Elina Svitolina → replaced by  Lesia Tsurenko

During the tournament
  Naomi Osaka (abdominal injury)

Retirements 
  Victoria Azarenka (right shoulder injury)
  Julia Görges (neck injury)

Doubles main draw entrants

Seeds

1 Rankings as of April 15, 2019.

Other entrants
The following pair received a wildcard into the main draw:
  Mona Barthel  /  Anna-Lena Friedsam
  Anastasia Pavlyuchenkova /  Lucie Šafářová

Finals

Singles

 Petra Kvitová defeated  Anett Kontaveit, 6–3, 7–6(7–2). 
 It was Kvitova's 2nd title of the season and the 27th of her career.

Doubles

 Mona Barthel /  Anna-Lena Friedsam defeated  Anastasia Pavlyuchenkova /  Lucie Šafářová, 2–6, 6–3, [10–6].

References

External links
 

Porsche Tennis Grand Prix
Porsche Tennis Grand Prix
Porsche Tennis Grand Prix
2010s in Baden-Württemberg
Porsche Tennis Grand Prix
Porsche